Holstebro Boldklub (also known as HB) is a football club based in the town of Holstebro, West Jutland, Denmark, that competes in the Denmark Series, the fifth tier of the Danish football league system. Founded in 1921, it is affiliated to the DBU Jutland, the regional body of football in Jutland. The team plays its home matches at Holstebro Idrætspark, where it has been based since 1989.

History 
Holstebro Boldklub was formed on 21 March 1921. Before this cricket was the main sport in the town of Holstebro, while association football was introduced in the region around the turn of the century. The first football match in the town was on the market square between the antecedent to Holstebro Boldklub called Holstebro Idrætsforening, and the main club from the neighbour town Lemvig. In the 1910s, the teams from Holstebro and Lemvig were among the best in Jutland and public interest grew quickly. In 1919, this resulted in a record 5,000 spectators in a match against Skive. However, it had become clear that modern facilities were needed in order to organise the sport further.

On 21 March 1921, Johannes Nielsen called to a meeting at the town's temperance hotel, which was located on Nørregade, which would result in the formation of Holstebro Boldklub. Nielsen became the club's first chairman. Besides him, the board also consisted of grocer Bjerrehus, gardener Rasmussen, cigar makers Ottow and Laursen, baker Jensen and slaughterhouse worker Ejner Skød. Two years later, cigar maker Otto Ottow became chairman, bookkeeper Krunderup became treasurer and director Alfred "Asse" Nørgaard became secretary. Even though Holstebro Boldklub in its first few seasons won the JBU B-række, the A-række, Mellemrækken and, in 1926, reached promotion to Mesterrækken, today known as the Jutland Series, which is the highest regional level and the fifth level of the Danish football league system, it was not all fun and games. Even back in this era the club's best players moved to the stronger regional teams, which in the 1920s was mainly Herning Fremad, who had already established themselves as a Mesterrækken team. Due to Holstebro losing its best players, they suffered relegation after only one season at that level.

In 1999, Holstebro Boldklub became official Danish champions in indoor football.

References

External links
 Holstebro Boldklub official website

 
Football clubs in Denmark
Association football clubs established in 1921
1921 establishments in Denmark
Holstebro